The vice director of the Joint Staff (VDJS) is a two-star officer in the Joint Staff. The vice director reports to the director of the Joint Staff and provides oversight to Joint Staff support activities, including administration and action management, budget, information technology and services, support services, and security. The vice director also oversees the directorate of management in the Joint Staff.

List of vice directors of the Joint Staff

References

See also
 Director of the Joint Staff
 Joint Staff

Joint Chiefs of Staff